Sheppard Mullens, sometimes spelled Shepart Mullins or Shepherd Mullens, (died August 7, 1871) was a public official and state legislator in Texas. He served one term in the Texas House of Representatives and also served as a delegate to the state's 1868 Constitutional Convention.

He married Sallie Downs December 29, 1866 In 1869 Major General Joseph J. Reynolds, military commander of Texas, appointed Mullens to a four-year term as a McLennan county commissioner in 1869. He was buried at the First Street Cemetery in Waco.

References

Members of the Texas House of Representatives
Year of birth missing
1871 deaths